Microphotus fragilis is a species of firefly in the family of beetles known as Lampyridae. It is found in North America. They tend to be more easily found in desert landscapes. This species of firefly is known for its huge eyes that are accompanied by a strongly convex pronotum.

References

Further reading

 
 

Lampyridae
Bioluminescent insects
Articles created by Qbugbot
Beetles described in 1912